This article lists veterinary pharmaceutical drugs alphabetically by name. Many veterinary drugs have more than one name and, therefore, the same drug may be listed more than once.

Abbreviations are used in the list as follows:
 INN = International Nonproprietary Name
 BAN = British Approved Name
 USAN = United States Adopted Name

A
 acepromazine – sedative, tranquilizer, and antiemetic
 albendazole - antihelminthic
 alprazolam – benzodiazepine used as an anxiolytic and tranquilizer
 altrenogest – used to synchronizes estrus
 amantadine – analgesic for chronic pain 
 aminophylline – bronchodilator
 amitraz – antiparasitic
 amitriptyline – tricyclic antidepressant used to treat separation anxiety, excessive grooming dogs and cats
 amlodipine – calcium channel blocker used to decrease blood pressure
 amoxicillin – antibacterial 
 apomorphine – emetic (used to induce vomiting)
 artificial tears – lubricant eye drops used as a tear supplement
 atenolol – treats cardiac arrhythmias, hypertension, and diabetes plus other cardiovascular disorders
 atipamezole – α2-adrenergic antagonist used to reverse the sedative and analgesic effects of alpha-2 adrenergic receptor agonists

B
 benazepril – ACE-inhibitor used in heart failure, hypertension, chronic kidney failure and protein-losing nephropathy
 bethanechol – stimulates bladder contractions, tranquilizer, makes the patient feel no pain
 bupivacaine – local anesthetic primarily utilized pre- and post-operatively
 buprenorphine – narcotic for pain relief in cats after surgery
 butorphanol – mu agonist/kappa antagonist, used as a cough suppressant and for a muscle relaxation effect in horses
 bedinvetmab - anti-NGF monoclonal antibody used for osteoarthritis in dogs

C
 carprofen – COX-2 selective NSAID used to relieve pain and inflammation in dogs and cats
 cephalexin – antibiotic, particularly useful for susceptible Staphylococcus infections
 cefovecin – cephalosporin-class antibiotic used to treat skin infections in dogs and cats
 cefpodoxime – antibiotic
 ceftiofur – cephalosporin antibiotic
 chloral hydrate/magnesium sulfate/pentobarbital – combination anesthetic agent
 chloramphenicol – antibacterial used to treat anaerobic bacterial infections, both Gram-positive and -negative
 cimetidine – H2 antagonist used to reduce gastric acid production
 ciprofloxacin – antibiotic of quinolone group
 clamoxyquine – antiparasitic to treat salmonids for infection with the myxozoan parasite, Myxobolus cerebralis
 clavamox – antibiotic, used to treat skin and other infections
 clavaseptin – antibiotic
 clavulanic acid – adjunct to penicillin-derived antibiotics used to overcome resistance in bacteria that secrete beta-lactamase
 clenbuterol – decongestant and bronchodilator used for the treatment of recurrent airway obstruction in horses
 clindamycin – antibiotic with particular use in dental infections with effects against most aerobic Gram-positive cocci
 clomipramine – primarily used in dogs to treat behavioral problems
 cyproheptadine – used as an appetite stimulant in cats and dogs

D
 deracoxib – (NSAID) nonsteroidal anti-inflammatory drug
 dexamethasone – anti-inflammatory steroid
 diazepam – benzodiazepine used to treat status epilepticus, also used as a preanaesthetic and a sedative
 dichlorophene – fungicide, germicide, and antimicrobial agent, also used for the removal of parasites
 diphenhydramine – histamine blocker
 doxycycline – antibiotic, also used to treat Lyme disease

E
 enalapril – ACE-inhibitor used to treat high blood pressure and heart failure
 enrofloxacin – Broad spectrum antibiotic (Gram-positive and -negative) -- not recommended for streptococci, or anaerobic bacteria
 equine chorionic gonadotropin – gonadotropic hormone used to induce ovulation in livestock prior to artificial insemination

F
 fenbendazole – antiparasite drug use for mainly against nematodes
 fipronil – antiparasiticide
 flumazenil - reversal agent for benzodiazepines 
 flunixin meglumine – nonsteroidal anti-inflammatory drug used as an analgesic and antipyretic in horses
 furosemide – diuretic used to prevent exercise-induced pulmonary hemorrhage in horses
 Frunevetmab - [anti NGF monoclonal antibody]] used for osteoarthritis in cats

G
 gabapentin – strong pain reliever
 gentamicin/betamethasone valerate/clotrimazole – combination drug product used to treat ear disease in dogs
 glycopyrrolate – emergency drug used for cardiac support

H
 hydromorphone – opioid analgesic used as a premedication
 hydroxyzine – antihistamine drug used primarily for treatment of allergies

I
 imidacloprid/moxidectin – antiparasitic product
 isoxsuprine – vasodilator used for laminitis and navicular disease in horses
 ivermectin – a broad-spectrum antiparasitic used in horses, cattle, sheep, goats and dogs

K
 ketamine – dissociative anesthetic and tranquilizer in cats, dogs, horses, and other animals
 ketoprofen – nonsteroidal anti-inflammatory drug (NSAID)

L
 levamisole – antiparasitic
 levetiracetam – anti-convulsant used for seizures
 levothyroxine – used in the treatment of hypothyroidism
 lufenuron – insecticide used for flea control
 Lokivetmab -Anti IL31 monoclonal anttibody used for atopic dermatitis in dogs

Meloxidyl
 marbofloxacin – antibiotic
 maropitant – antiemetic
 mavacoxib – nonsteroidal anti-inflammatory drug (NSAID)
 medetomidine – surgical anesthetic and analgesic
 meloxicam – nonsteroidal anti-inflammatory drug (NSAID)
 metacam – used to reduce inflammation and pain
 methimazole – used in treatment of hyperthyroidism
 methocarbamol - muscle relaxant used to reduce muscle spasms associated with inflammation, injury, intervertebral disc disease, and certain toxicities 
 metoclopramide – potent antiemetic, secondarily as a prokinetic
 metronidazole – antibiotic against anaerobic bacteria
 milbemycin oxime – broad spectrum antiparasitic used as an anthelmintic, insecticide and miticide
 mirtazapine – antiemetic and appetite stimulant in cats and dogs
 mitratapide – used to help weight loss in dogs
 morphine – pure mu agonist/opioid analgesic used as a premedication
 moxifloxacin – antibiotic

N
 neomycin – antibacterial
 nimuselide – nonsteroidal anti-inflammatory drug (NSAID)
 nitarsone – feed additive used in poultry to increase weight gain, improve feed efficiency, and prevent histomoniasis (blackhead disease)
 nitenpyram – insecticide
 nitroscanate – anthelmintic used to treat roundworms, hookworms and tapeworms
 nitroxynil – anthelmintic for fasciola and liver fluke infestations
 nystatin – antifungal

O
 oclacitinib – antipruritic
 ofloxacin – fluoroquinolone antibiotic
 omeprazole – used for treatment and prevention of gastric ulcers in horses
 oxibendazole – anthelmintic
 oxymorphone – analgesic
 oxytetracycline – antibiotic
 Onsior in cats - used to treat pain and inflammation

P
 pentobarbital – humane euthanasia of animals not to be used for food
 pentoxyfylline – xanthine derivative used in as an antiinflammatory drug and in the prevention of endotoxemia
 pergolide – dopamine receptor agonist used for the treatment of pituitary pars intermedia dysfunction in horses
 phenobarbital – anti-convulsant used for seizures
 phenylbutazone – nonsteroidal anti-inflammatory drug (NSAID)
 phenylpropanolamine – controls urinary incontinence in dogs
 phenytoin/pentobarbital – animal euthanasia product containing phenytoin and pentobarbital
 pimobendan – phosphodiesterase 3 inhibitor used to manage heart failure in dogs
 pirlimycin – antimicrobial
 ponazuril – anticoccidial
 praziquantel – treatment of infestations of the tapeworms Dipylidium caninum, Taenia pisiformis, Echinococcus granulosus
 prazosin – sympatholytic used in hypertension and abnormal muscle contractions
 prednisolone – glucocorticoid (steroid) used in the management of inflammation and auto-immune disease, primarily in cats
 prednisone – glucocorticoid (steroid) used in the management of inflammation and auto immune disease
 pregabalin – neuropathic pain reliever and anti-convulsant
 propofol – short acting intravenous drug used to induce anesthesia
 pyrantel – effective against ascarids, hookworms and stomach worms

R
 rafoxanide – parasiticide
 rifampin – anti-microbial primarily used in conjunction with other erythromycin in the treatment of Rhodococcus equi infections in foals
 robenacoxib – nonsteroidal anti-inflammatory drug (NSAID)
 roxarsone – arsenical used as a coccidiostat and for increased weight gain

S
 selamectin – antiparasitic treating fleas, roundworms, ear mites, heartworm, and hookworms
 silver sulfadiazine – antibacterial
 streptomycin – antibiotic used in large animals
 sucralfate – treats gastric ulcers
 sulfasalazine – anti-inflammatory and antirheumatic

T
 Telazol – intravenous drug used to induce anesthesia; combination of tiletamine and zolazepam
 tepoxalin – nonsteroidal anti-inflammatory drug (NSAID)
 theophylline – for bronchospasm and cardiogenic edema
 thiostrepton – antibiotic
 thiabendazole – antiparasitic
 tolfenamic acid — nonsteroidal anti-inflammatory drug (NSAID)
 tramadol – analgesic
 triamcinolone acetonide – corticosteroid
 trimethoprim — used widely for bacterial infections, is in the family of sulfa drugs
 trimethoprim/sulfadoxine — antibacterial containing trimethoprim and sulfadoxine
 trilostane – for canine Cushing's (hyperadrenocorticism) syndrome
 tylosin – antibiotic
 trazodone – antidepressant

U
 ursodeoxycholic acid (INN) or ursodiol (USAN) — hydrophilic bile acid used to treat liver diseases

X
 xylazine – α2-adrenergic agonist, used to temporarily sedate animals

Y
 yohimbine – used to reverse effects of xylazine, also called an "antidote" to xylazine

Z
 zonisamide – anti-convulsant used for seizures

A2
 Anesthesia - used as a sedative before surgery

External links
 Animal Drugs @ FDA

Veterinary
Veterinary drugs